The 2006 Outback Bowl was an American college football bowl game played January 2, 2006, at Raymond James Stadium in Tampa, Florida. It was the 20th edition of the Outback Bowl and featured the Iowa Hawkeyes of the Big Ten Conference, and the Florida Gators from the Southeastern Conference (SEC). Florida came into the game under first-year head coach Urban Meyer with an 8–3 record. The Hawkeyes, led by 7th year head coach Kirk Ferentz, came into the game with a 7–4 record.

Teams

The 2006 Outback Bowl was the third all-time meeting between the two programs. Florida won the 1983 Gator Bowl 14-6 over the Hawkeyes, and Iowa defeated the Gators 37-17 in the 2004 Outback Bowl.

Iowa

Florida

Game summary
Florida got on the board first, only 2 minutes into the game, when Tremaine McCollum blocked an Iowa punt, and returned it 6 yards for a touchdown. That was the only scoring of the first quarter. In the second quarter, Iowa stopped Florida inside its own five yard line, but Florida got a field goal from kicker Chris Hetland, to go up 10-0. With 1:57 left in the half, and Iowa driving, Iowa quarterback Drew Tate was intercepted by cornerback Vernell Brown, who returned it 60 yards for a touchdown, and a 17-0 lead.

Iowa came right back though, as quarterback Drew Tate found wide receiver Clinton Solomon for a 20 yard touchdown pass, to trim the lead to 17-7 with 1:10 to go in the half. It was enough time for Florida however, as Florida scored its first offensive touchdown of the game. Quarterback Chris Leak found wide receiver Dallas Baker for a 24 yard touchdown pass with 1 second left in the half, as Florida took a 24-7 lead into the locker room.

With 5:23 left in the third quarter, Florida seemingly put the game away, with a 38 yard touchdown pass from Leak to Baker, to put Florida up 31-7, but Iowa would come back. Early in the fourth quarter, Drew Tate found wide receiver Ed Hinkel for a 4 yard touchdown pass to trim the margin to 31-14. With less than 7 minutes to play, Tate again found Hinkel, this time for a 14 yard touchdown pass, as Iowa drew within 31-21. Iowa stopped Florida once again, and got the ball back.

With 1:24 left in the game, Kirk Ferentz decided to kick a field goal, since they were down 2 possessions anyway. Kyle Schlicher kicked a 45 yard field goal, to make it a one possession game. His onside kick attempt was recovered by Iowa, but Iowa was controversially flagged for being offside, and Florida regained possession on the subsequent attempt. The game was noted for its extremely controversial  calls leading to allegations that Florida bribed the officials.

Scoring summary

Source:

Team Statistics

References

External links
 http://www.usatoday.com/sports/scores106/106002/NCAAF163153.htm

ReliaQuest Bowl
Outback Bowl
Outback Bowl
21st century in Tampa, Florida
Florida Gators football bowl games
Iowa Hawkeyes football bowl games
January 2006 sports events in the United States